Steveston Secondary School was a former public high school in Richmond, British Columbia, Canada. It was operated by the Richmond School District. In the school year 2007-08 it combined with nearby Charles E. London Secondary School to form Steveston-London Secondary School (SLSS). The combined school is on the site of the former London Secondary, with the Steveston Secondary building out of use and demolished.

History
Steveston Secondary was opened in 1956 originally for students from the Steveston fishing village in southwestern Richmond. Initially, it was a junior high school teaching grades 7-9, then became a combined junior-secondary school, and then it became a Senior Secondary with only Grades 11 and 12. In 1996, it was expanded back again to include the full grades 8-12.

New additions to school were completed over the years to account for its burgeoning size. In 1966, an Industrial Education wing was added, in 1970 the library expanded, two new classrooms and home economics labs were added, in 1971 the gym was altered, in 1974 the student lounge was built and in 1978 a Social Studies wing was added. The year 1981 saw the biggest renovation yet, a million-dollar project for Steveston’s Silver Jubilee.

The Steveston High School Alumni Association (SHSAA) was established in 1987 by the graduates of 1962 who were celebrating their 25-year reunion. SHSAA was the first public high school alumni association in Canada.

In 1988, the school opened one of the first in-house Fish Hatcheries at a public school in British Columbia. Fish were raised at the school and released into local streams.

After the school's 2007-08 merger with Charles E. London Secondary School, the Steveston secondary building has remained vacant. On occasion, the building appeared to be used for the training the Royal Canadian Mounted Police (RCMP), possibly in preparation for the 2010 Winter Olympics in Vancouver.

As of 2013, the land which the school resides on was purchased by Polygon Homes. The school building was stripped of asbestos in 2015, followed by demolition, which was completed in the summer of 2016 due to remaining traces of asbestos. Subsequently, construction began for Kingsley Estates, a collection of prestigious, 2- and 3-level four-bedroom executive townhomes bordering a 5-acre park. Residents of the new development get to enjoy exclusive access to a private clubhouse and a resident concierge which was fully completed by the fall of 2019.

Special Events and Projects
Over the years, there are numerous events that became proud traditions at the school. The Halloween Dance, the Purple and Gold basketball tournament, home opener basketball games, and the home coming dance. Ever since the mid-1970s, Steveston hosted the classic Purple and Gold basketball tournament each year. It consisted of 16 teams from different schools throughout the province.

Beginning in 1983, Steveston became a sponsor of the privately run Casa Guatemala Orphanage in Guatemala. The students would spend much of the school year fundraising to help donate to the orphanage, and starting from 1990, the school would send a select group of students to visit and volunteer at the orphanage each year. In 1994-1995, Steveston sponsored Guillermo Perez, a student from Guatemala to spend a year studying at the school.

Breakfast with Santa was held annually on the last day of school before the Christmas Holidays. Classes would sing Christmas carols in different languages and staff would be called up to sing "The 12 Days of Christmas" much to the humour and delight of the students. This event usually raised over $1000 for the Richmond Food Bank. In 1992, the PAC and Dry-Grad committee put on Steveston's first "dry grad" celebration for Steveston’s graduating students.

References

External links

School website
Steveston Alumni site

High schools in Richmond, British Columbia
Educational institutions established in 1956
Educational institutions disestablished in 2007
1956 establishments in British Columbia
2007 disestablishments in British Columbia